La Martinière College is a private educational institution for the upper elite class located in Lucknow, the capital of the Indian state of Uttar Pradesh. The college consists of two schools on different campuses for boys and girls. La Martinière College (for boys) was founded in 1845 and La Martinière Girls' College was established in 1869. The Boys' College is the only school in the world to have been awarded royal battle honours for its role in the defence of Lucknow during the Indian Rebellion of 1857. The two Lucknow colleges are part of the La Martinière family of schools founded by the French adventurer Major General Claude Martin. There are two La Martinière Colleges in Kolkata and three in Lyon. La Martinière provides a liberal education and the medium of instruction is the English language. The schools cater for pupils from the ages of five through to 17 or 18, and are open to children of all religious denominations, the boys' school has a Chapel, a Hindu Temple and a Mosque on its campus and has remained a non-denominational school since its inception, unlike the two La Martiniere Schools in Calcutta which are Christian schools, controlled by the Anglican Church of North India. The schools have day scholars and residence scholars (boarders).

The Economist has described its Constantia building as "perhaps the best-preserved colonial building in Lucknow".

Major-General Claude Martin

La Martinière Boys' College was founded by an endowment from the wealthy eighteenth-century Frenchman, Major-General Claude Martin (1735–1800), who was an officer in the French and later the British East India Company. Martin acquired his fortune while serving Asaf-ud-Daula, the nawab wazir of Awadh, and was reputedly the richest Frenchman in India. Constantia, the palatial building which now houses the Boys' College, was built in 1785 as Martin's country residence, but was not completed until 1802, two years after Martin's death on 13 September 1800. Historians believe that the house takes its name from the school motto Labore et Constantia (Work and Constancy) which represents Martin's personal philosophy. There is a more romantic, though unproven, notion that the building was named after Constance, a young French girl who was supposedly Martin's first love.

Martin never married and he had no heirs. In his will, dated 1 January 1800, he left the bulk of his estate to provide for the establishment of three schools to be named La Martinière in his memory. The schools were to be located in Lucknow, Calcutta and at Lyon, his birthplace in France. The residue of his estate after bequests had been made was to be used for the maintenance of these schools. He directed that the school in Lucknow should be established at Constantia and that the house should be kept as a "school or College for learning young men the English language and Christian religion if they found themselves inclined".

Martin instructed in his will that his 'body be salted, put in spirits or embalmed', and placed in a lead coffin in a vault beneath the house. His tomb should carry a plaque bearing the following inscription:
Major-General Claude Martin.
Arrived in India as a common soldier
and died at Lucknow on 13 September,
1800, as a Major-General.
He is buried in this tomb.
Pray for his soul.
It is popularly believed that Martin was motivated not just by vanity but by a desire to protect his property after his death and to prevent his friend, the nawab, from acquiring it. By having himself, a Christian, buried beneath Constantia, he knew that the building would be permanently desecrated in the Muslim nawab's eyes. Chandan Mitra, in his book Constant Glory, thinks otherwise. He writes "Constantia's plans show that the basement mausoleum was part of the original scheme for the building and not included as an afterthought to guard against requisition."

Martin was duly interred in a specially prepared vault in the basement of the house. Thus, Constantia became both a school and a mausoleum. It is the largest European funerary monument in India, and the historian William Dalrymple has described it as "The East India Company's answer to the Taj Mahal".

Early years
After Martin's death there were protracted disputes in the Calcutta High Court and consequently his will was not proved until 1840. In the interim the Constantia building was used as a guest house for visiting Europeans. The school finally opened on 1 October 1845 with some seventy boys on roll. The first Principal was John Newmarch.

Unlike the Calcutta La Martinière, the Lucknow school was technically established outside British territory so right from its inception its interaction with local society was frequent. There was also a native branch of the school in the Maqbara Umjid Ali Shah at Hazratgunj in the centre of Lucknow. There were plans to move the native school to a different location, although it is not known whether this actually took place.

The first major challenge for the La Martinière School was the events of 1857 when it had to leave its premises and assisted in the defence of the Lucknow Residency.

La Martinière during the 1857 uprising

The events of 1857 saw the making of the Martinian military legend. For the first time in history, Britain called on schoolboys to assist in the military conflict – namely the defence of the Lucknow Residency. The names of eight staff members, sixty seven boys and one ensign (old boy) are inscribed on the 'Roll of Honour, defence of the Residency 1857' at La Martinière Lucknow. The siege began on 30 June 1857. Early in June, the Chief Commissioner of Oudh, Sir Henry Lawrence ordered the Martinière be evacuated and for several days the boys travelled from the Residency to the college collecting provisions. The force within the Residency then consisted of British and Indian troops and civilian volunteers including a number of Anglo-Indians. The Martinière contingent was commanded by the Principal, Mr. George Schilling. The Residency was under siege for eighty-six days, until relieved by Sir Colin Campbell in November 1857.

The role of the boys and masters of La Martinière has been well documented in Chandan Mitra's 1987 book titled Constant Glory – La Martinière saga 1836–1986. The Residency fortifications and defended houses were about a mile in circumference, and the Martinière contingent, along with a detachment of the 32nd Regiment of Foot, were garrisoned in a strongly built house containing tykhanas (cellars) and adjoining outhouses. The position became known as The Martinière Post and was a mere thirty feet distant from Johannes House, held by the rebels, and as a consequence, was exposed to heavy shelling.

Apart from actual fighting, the boys performed a number of tasks within the Residency compound – some ran messages to the hospital, watched over the sick and wounded, ground corn and manned the telegraph connecting the Residency to Alam Bagh; others were seconded to domestic duties in place of native servants who had absconded. Despite the dangers, casualties among the boys were few. Two died of dysentery and two others were wounded in action. Their diet consisted of mutton soup. On one occasion, a mine blew down the outer room of The Martinière Post, but the boys defended the breach and after several days of bitter fighting managed to drive off the enemy housed opposite their camp.

Major Gorman in his Great Exploits – The Siege of Lucknow wrote that the Martinière boys erected an amateur semaphore on the Residency tower from instructions given in a number of the Penny Encyclopaedia. The semaphore enabled General Outram to advise the commander of the relieving force Sir Colin Campbell 'to give the city a wide berth', avoiding the heavy enemy batteries on the direct road to the Residency. The fiercest fighting of the advance that followed was at the Martinière College, strongly defended by the Indian Freedom Fighters. Sir Colin dislodged them, occupied the college, setting up another semaphore on its roof to communicate with Outram. The Martinière contingent took part in the secret evacuation of the Residency, and the rambling journey of six weeks across India which followed, until finally arriving by boat at Benares. After the Siege the college was temporarily moved to Benares. Classrooms were established in bungalows and the school routine recommenced.

Rewards and battle honours
Principal Schilling's leadership was well rewarded. He became a taluqdar, or noble of Oudh, with an estate worth £30,000, thereby ensuring a comfortable retirement in England. The Martinière contribution was officially recognised in Queen Victoria's (1858) proclamation. The staff and the boys who served during the Indian Rebellion of 1857 were all awarded the Indian Mutiny Medal, inscribed with the words "Defence of Lucknow", in recognition of their courage and steadfastness.

The awards were notified to the principal on 5 February 1861 by a letter from the chief commissioner of Oudh. However, it was not until 1932, following a request by the college, that the British Government recognised Martinière's role in 1857. The school was granted the right, on ceremonial occasions, to carry a British Army regimental-style 'colour' or flag bearing its own coat of arms with a picture of the Residency and the words "Defence of Lucknow, 1857". It thus became the only school in the world to be awarded a British battle honour. McGill University in Canada is the only other educational institution in the British Empire to be awarded the same honour for its role in World War I.

Bishop Cotton made the following reference to the Martinière action at St. Paul's Cathedral, Calcutta on 28 July 1860: Public thanksgiving to Almighty God for deliverance from the sepoy revolt should take expression in the form of schools for the children of the Community that had stood so nobly by England in her hour of need and which shed its blood for kinsmen across the seas.

The flag has not been displayed publicly since 1947 as the subject caused some ambivalence. Satish Bhatnagar, author of Bright Renown: La Martinière College Lucknow comments: "I once asked the principal why the school is hiding the honour. He said he didn't know how the Indian government would take it."

After 1857

La Martinière Lucknow, like its counterpart in Calcutta, expanded rapidly after the rebellion of 1857 There were 148 students on its rolls in 1859, but the number had increased to 277 by 1862. Boarders came from all over the province from districts like Pratapgarh, Mirzapur, Gorakhpur, Allahabad, Kanpur and Etawah.

The records show that in 1865 over 120 boys qualified for admission to the higher department of the Civil Engineering College at Roorkee.

In the years following the mutiny, the city of Lucknow, now under the British Crown, was redesigned. La Martinière emerged as an outpost of the British Empire and it acquired the traditions of English public schools.

In 1869, the La Martinière Girls' School was founded and in 1871 it moved to its present location in the compound of Khurshid Manzil. Initially the Girls' School was under the management of the Boys' School. The La Martinière College Principal was in overall charge of both the Boys' and Girls' Schools, with the Girls' school headed by a Lady Superintendent.

The late nineteenth century and the early twentieth century saw the emergence of the school as an exclusive school preferred by the landed aristocracy of Awadh.

In 1945, the college celebrated its Centenary.

In wake of threat of invasion by the Japanese during the Second World War, the Calcutta Schools were re-located to Lucknow.

After Indian Independence, the curriculum was changed in 1947, with Urdu being dropped as a compulsory subject and replaced by Hindi. Many Anglo-Indians both students and Masters left for Britain and Australia. This trend was to continue till almost the mid-seventies

In 1951, Mr. Meredith Doutre was appointed as the first Indian principal of the college. He was succeeded by Col HRH Daniels in the 1960s and then by Mr. DEW Shaw in the mid-1970s. The bulk of the students were drawn from the upper middle and middle classes.

In 1960, there was flooding of the grounds by the Gomti River resulting in the evacuation of staff and boys to higher ground. In 1962 and 1971 again major floods occurred which threatened the building. The Government constructed a protective bund in 1973–74 which separated the school lake from the main vista thus substantially reducing the earlier picturesque setting.

In 1976 the school was affiliated to the Indian Council for Secondary Education system of education. This entailed the exam for the Certificate of Secondary Education (class X) and the School Leaving Certificate (class XII).

In 1995 the school celebrated its sesquicentennial anniversary. Former principals, old Martinians from all over the country and abroad, and delegations from Lyon and Calcutta, came to Lucknow for this once in a lifetime event. To commemorate the occasion, a history of the college "Bright Renown" was released, an exhibition on the history of the school was organized, and for several days the Constantia was lit up in the night. The President of India released a postage stamp to recognize the contribution of La Martiniere Lucknow.

In 1997 one of the teachers was murdered in the early hours of the morning on 7 March. Thirty-year-old Anglo-Indian Frederick Gomes, the college's assistant warden and physical training instructor, was murdered in his bungalow on the perimeter of the school grounds. Two people were seen firing shots through a broken window at the back of the building, but the culprits were not identified and the murder remains unsolved. However, the murder created a sensation in India at the time, especially when it was found that the school's students had access to guns. Newspaper columnist Saeed Naqvi, Ashank Mehrotra former pupils at the school commented: "The killing is a metaphor of our times. For such a level of violence to reach the sacred precincts of La Martinière is symbolic of the way that Lucknow, like so much of India, has completely ceased to be what it once was."

Constantia

The sprawling estate also includes a village called Martin Purwa, named after Claude Martin, and part of the Lucknow Zoo.

Constantia stands on a landscaped terrace overlooking what was once a lake, from the centre of which rises a solid fluted column with a Moorish cupola known as 'the Laat'. The monument is about forty metres (~125 feet) high, and is thought either to be a lighthouse or a marker for the grave of Claude Martin's horse. Over the years, the Gomti River has edged closer, necessitating the construction of a river bund between the front terrace and 'the Lat'. In 1960, the grounds were flooded and the 1803 and 1934 earthquakes caused several statues to fall from their pedestals where they crown the architecture. The statues are in modern and older antique styles.

The building is constructed in an unusual mix of styles. The rooms are decorated in bas-reliefs, arabesques and other Italian styled ornamentation. The eighteenth-century English potter Josiah Wedgwood was said to be responsible for the plaster of Paris plaques decorating the library and the chapel. However, the plaques which depict classical and mythological subjects are thought to be of local construction. Orders for tons of imported plaster of Paris were discovered in Martin's letters, it is believed that they are in fact based on just one or two original models. What was imported was the large mirrors, French carpets, inlaid marble tables and paintings including some by Johann Zoffany who was a friend of Claude Martin. The building has been described as, "part Enlightenment mansion, part Nawabi fantasy, and part Gothic colonial barracks. Its facade mixes Georgian colonnades with the loopholes and turrets of a medieval castle; above, Palladian arcades rise to Mughal copulas."

Philip Davies writing on Architecture of the Raj in the illustrated London News of May 1982 has this to say about the Constantia:

" Built in the 1790s it is a bizarre building in a country renowned for extravagant eccentricities. Even more incongruously it now houses an eminent Indian Public school blessed with all the tribal rituals of Eton or Harrow. It is a disturbing building of the most peculiar design. The central tower has bridge links and the entire central range has a strange array of statues dominated by two huge lions whose eyes were supposedly lit by red lanterns."

History of the Girls' School
Unlike the schools in Calcutta and Lyons there had been no provision to found a girls' school in Lucknow. However funds were found from a female education fund and a school was started at Moti Mahal. The Lucknow Girls' School, as it was then known, was run by Mrs. Saunders Abbott. Following a land grant from the government the school was moved to its present location at Khursheed Manzil in 1871 and incorporated and established as a branch of La Martinière College. The adoption and endowment was facilitated by the distribution by the High Court of Calcutta of the surplus funds of the legacy for the release and relief of prisoners for debt left by General Claude Martin.

Khursheed Manzil, or the House of the Sun, is a large two story mansion marked by towers at the corners. The building was begun by Saadat Ali Khan, and completed by his son, Ghazi-ud-Din Haidar. The property was built in the form of a fortified castle. There is a -wide moat, over which there was formerly a drawbridge. After the annexation of Oudh, in 1856, Khursheed Manzil was used as a mess house by officers of the 32nd Regiment, and it became known as the Mess House.

During the rebellion of 1857 it was the scene of some stubborn fighting, in which both Lord Wolseley, then a captain, and Lord Roberts, as a lieutenant bore an active part. The latter planted the flag of the 2nd Punjab Infantry on the west turret as a sign of capture. The building was stormed and taken on 17 November 1857. In constant reminder of those days, a small pillar stands just inside the gate to the left. It bears the following inscription: "It was here that Havelock, Outram and Sir Colin Campbell met on 17th November 1857".

In 1889 Government raised the school to the High or Final Standard of Education for Europeans. Later the school was recognized for the Overseas Examination Board of Cambridge University.

In 1907, on the recommendation of Mr. S. H. Butler, C.I.E, the Deputy Commissioner, The Government gave the Trustees and Governor of the school a piece of land adjoining the compound on the west of the Bank of Bengal (now the State Bank of India) considerably increasing the size of the estate and greatly improving the playground.

Houses

The college is divided into four houses, mainly for promoting academic and athletic competition among the pupils. The houses were first given their names in 1913. The houses and their motos are Cornwallis (Never Give In), Hodson (Do or Die), Martin (Nil Desperandum), Lyons (To The End). The houses are named after Lord Cornwallis, Major William Hodson, Lyons, after the birthplace of Claude Martin and Martin after Major General Claude Martin. Each houses are headed by housemaster/mistress, the most senior teacher in the house. He is aided by a House Captain and prefects from the senior high school.
Lord Chelmsford Challenge Cup is awarded on prize day to the house which has performed best with highest house points in every field during the academic year.

Principals

Boys' School 
 John Newmarch was the first Principal of La Martinière, Lucknow, in 1845.
 Leonidas Clint (1812 – 21 July 1897), was the Principal of La Martinière, Lucknow, from about 1845 to 1854. He was a graduate of Trinity College, Cambridge. After leaving Martinière Clint returned to the UK to take up holy orders. He was ordained as a deacon in 1859 and as a priest in 1861 (St David's). He was curate of Lamphey, Pembrokeshire (1859–1861), Hereford (1861–1863), Presteigne, Powys (1863–1865), and Brockhampton, Herefordshire (1865–1874). He was the vicar of Lingen, Herefordshire from 1874 to 1893. He was the editor of Dryden's Flower and Leaf and the author of Conic Sections. He died in Dewsbury, Yorkshire, aged 85.
 George Schilling was promoted to Principal in 1854, having previously served as assistant master at La Martiniere Calcutta. He was the Principal during the siege of Lucknow in 1857.
James W.H. Stobart
Thomas Gaskell Sykes
 Lieutenant Thomas Percival Wood (1882 – 25 September 1915), Principal of La Martinière Boys' College (1910–1915) and officer with the Lucknow Volunteer Rifles. Wood was educated at Dulwich College, London, and Peterhouse College, Cambridge. He was English 'Proviseur' at the Lycée Ampere in Lyons from 1906 to 1907. He was appointed Principal of La Martinière Lucknow in 1910. Wood was an officer of the Lucknow Volunteer Rifles, and offered his services in August 1914. He was promoted to the position of lieutenant in the Indian Army reserve in February 1915. After spending four months with the 1/7th Gurkha Rifles in Quetta, he was drafted to the Expeditionary Force in France, where he joined the 3rd Queen Alexandra's Own Gurkha Rifles in September 1915. He was killed at the Battle of Loos while gallantly leading his men in action. His name is commemorated on the Neuve-Chapelle memorial in France.
 CLS Garnett was the Principal from 1915 to 1926.
Lt. Colonel Ralph S. Weir
 Lt. Colonel William Edgar Andrews, Principal of the Boys' College from 1926 to 1951. Andrews moved to India in 1914 to take up a post as senior history and geography master at La Martinière Calcutta. In 1921 he was appointed Headmaster of the Boys' High School and College in Allahabad. He was appointed Principal of La Martinière Lucknow in 1926. Andrews oversaw many changes and improvements to the college, including the construction of the modern well-equipped Spence and Sykes halls, the introduction of the school song, and the award of Battle Honours.
 Meredith Doutre was the first Indian Principal.
 Colonel Hector R H "Danny" Daniels.
Frank J deSouza
 Desmond Shaw was a former pupil of La Martinière Boys. Later he was Principal of the Cathedral & John Connon School, Mumbai.
 Terence Phillips was also a former pupil and was briefly Principal of the school. He recently retired from his role as the Principal of Wynberg Allen, Mussoorie.
 Elton Stein deSouza was a former pupil who headed his Alma mater for around 20 years and retired in 2011. He started raising funds for restoration of Constantia through College Souvenirs, Bollywood Film shootings and it is this fund that is now being used ingeniously by Mr. Carlyle McFarland for restoration of Constantia as well as adaptive reuse and beautification of the entire Constantia campus. He left for his heavenly abode in the morning of 18 April 2021 due to multiple organ failure compounded by Corona virus. The college flag was kept half-mast for three days. 
 Carlyle Andre' McFarland is the current principal of the college. He is an alumnus of the college, having competed his I.S.C. in 1979. He previously taught English at Lucknow Christian College.

Girls' School 
In the early years the Girls' School was led by a Lady Superintendent who reported to the Principal of the Boys' School.

Lady Superintendents 
 1869–1870 Miss Dixon
 1870–1871 Mrs Marshall
 1871–1872 Miss Wilson
 1872–1878 Miss Auld
 1879–1882 Miss Pennington
 1883–1884 Miss Brenan Hayes
 1885 Miss Mathews
 1886–1889 Miss Granger
 1890–1894 Miss Greenwood
 1894–1897 Miss Young
 1898–1901 Miss Edith Annette Gow
 1902–1906 Miss Stephenson Jellie

Principals 
 1907–1908 Miss Lavinia Teasdale was the first Principal and Honorary Secretary of the Girls' School.
 1909–1915 Miss Ida Williams
 1916–1923 Miss D. B. Oolving
 1924–1937 Miss M. Chick
 1937–1948 Mrs. Margaret Grayhurst
 1948–1950 Mrs. Ellen Howe
 1948–1950 Miss Annette Gresseux
 1951–1977 Miss Mary Annette Gresseux was the first Indian Principal. She was responsible for the expansion of the school and the building of the infrastructure.
 1978–1997 Mrs. Florence Keelor
 1997 – 12 February 2016 Mrs. Farida Abraham
 2017–present Mrs. Ashrita Dass

In popular culture

Film
The Boys' College has been the setting for films, including:

Kim, a 1950 MGM adventure film starring Errol Flynn, Dean Stockwell (as Kim), Paul Lukas and Robert Douglas.
Shakespeare Wallah, the 1965 Merchant Ivory Productions film loosely based on the real-life adventures of Felicity Kendal's family.
Shatranj Ke Khiladi (The Chess Players), the 1977 film by Satyajit Ray.
Stones of the Raj: The French Connection, a 1997 documentary for Channel 4 television by William Dalrymple.
Gadar: Ek Prem Katha, a 2001 Bollywood movie starring Sunny Deol, Amisha Patel, and Amrish Puri.
Indra, a 2002 Tollywood movie starring Chiranjeevi and Sonali Bendre.
Anwar, a 2007 Bollywood movie starring Nauheed Cyrusi.
Always Kabhi Kabhi, a 2011 Bollywood movie starring Ali Fazal (a former pupil) Giselle Monteiro, Zoa Morani, Satyajit Dubey, a directorial debut for Roshan Abbas and was produced under Shahrukh Khan's production house Red Chillies Entertainment. A film by Roshan Abbas, also a Martinian.
Jaanisaar, a 2015 film by former pupil Muzaffar Ali. When Raja Amir, an Indian prince raised in London, returns to India, he falls for Noor, a revolutionary courtesan. However, while her loyalties lie with India, his lie with the British Raj.
Prassthanam, a 2019 Indian Political action film. Another film where ex-Martinian Ali Fazal played an important role.

Gunjan Saxena, A 2020 film that stars Janhvi Kapoor as Indian Air Force pilot Gunjan Saxena, one of the first Indian female air-force pilots in combat, alongside Pankaj Tripathi and Angad Bedi in supporting roles.
 Madam Chief Minister is a 2020 Indian Hindi-language political drama film directed by Subhash Kapoor. The film stars Richa Chadda in the lead role. The film's official announcement was made by Chadda on 12 February 2020.

Rudyard Kipling's 1901 novel Kim tells of the adventures of Kimball O'Hara, the orphaned son of a British soldier. Kim is given the chance to go to St Xavier's School in Lucknow, the most prestigious school in British India. St Xavier's is a fictional creation but Kipling authorities believe that the school is modelled on real-life picturesque La Martinière College, Lucknow.

Literature and fiction
La Martinière Lucknow is discussed in Qurratulain Hyder's magnum opus Aag ka Darya (River of Fire). This book has the same status in Urdu literature as that of One Hundred Years of Solitude in Hispanic literature.

The Indian writer Allan Sealy, a former pupil of the school, set his first novel Trotter-Nama in the old house, which he renamed as Sans Souci (carefree). The school has also featured in short stories.

In her autobiography "Unfinished", Priyanka Chopra mentions her later schooling in a boarding house at La Martiniere Girls' College.

Postage stamps
The two La Martinière schools in Lucknow are one of the few educational institution in India, and possibly in the world, depicted on postage stamps.

On 1 October 1995, on the 150th anniversary of the school's opening, Dr. Shankar Dayal Sharma, the then President of India, released a two-rupee postage stamp in the school's honour.

In 2007 when the girls' school celebrated its 138th anniversary, it was given a similar honour and a first-day cover was issued by Department of Posts with a picture of Khursheed Manzil on it.

Curriculum

The academic curriculum includes Mathematics, both English Language and Literature, History and Civics, Geography, Principles of Accounts, Commercial Studies, Science, Art, Craft and Woodwork, Choral Singing, Hindi, Sanskrit and the French language (both up to Class VIII), Computer Studies and Physical Education (three times a week until Class 10).

Class 10 students are prepared for the Indian Certificate of Secondary Education and for the Indian School Certificate Examination when they are in Class 12.

The four streams at 10+2 stage are Humanities, Commerce, Life Sciences and Physical Sciences.

Extracurricular activities
Physical and military training – the college has a Senior Division National Cadet Corps (Rifles) Troop, and two troops of the junior Division (Naval and Air Wings), representing the three Defence Services. Younger boys belong to the School Scout Troop and Cub Pack. Thursday is the parade and Co-Curricular activities day when the NCC and Scout activities are performed. The Hashmann Memorial Shield is held on the last working day before Winter Vacations and is awarded to the best wing of the NCC.
Games and sports – games include athletics, gymnastics, cricket, soccer, basketball, badminton, volleyball, swimming, hockey, lawn tennis, table tennis, shooting, rugby, baseball, softball and horse riding.
Honing intellectual skills – debating, elocution, declamation, dramatics, creative writing and quizzing activities are conducted regularly.

Publications Club
Publications Club produces articles in English, French, Urdu, and Hindi for the monthly magazie The Martiniere Post.

College band
The school has a pipe band, which dates from 1967. It was part of the Senior Division NCC contingent and the band members played in NCC uniforms with hackles on their berets. In 2017 A Brass Band was introduced by the Principal Mr Carlyle McFarland. Both the bands now wear a designated uniform. Presently the boys are trained by Ex-Service man – Krishna Sharma who lead the AMC Centre and School Band and is decorated by the President of India.

Sports facilities

The college has extensive facilities for sports. There are two sports fields, known as the Polo Ground and the Fairy Dale Ground. The polo ground, as its name suggests, was originally used for polo games. Today it plays host to football and athletics. It is also the venue for the physical training displays on Annual Sports Day. Cricket and hockey are played at the Fairy Dale Ground. There is a large gym for gymnastics, a skating rink, an indoor shooting range, a Rugby field and an indoor swimming pool. The college also has a volleyball court, a basketball court, a swimming pool and lawn tennis courts. In all there are 10 Football fields, 8 Hockey fields, 2 Basketball courts, 2 Swimming Pools, A Paddock, 2 Cricket Arenas,

The college has four combative sports: Judo, Taekwondo, Muay Thai and Boxing. The school has stables for horse-riding, and an archery range.

The college has an Aviation Club where aviation sport is taught. The boys assemble aero model kits both control line and Remote Controlled. The Aeromodelling club is equipted with a simulator, a briefing room, test benches and a host of other equipment. The boys are prepared to appear for the Student Pilot Licence for Fixed Wing Aircraft. Power flying on Cessna 152B is scheduled to commence shortly.

Brevet Major William Stephen Raikes Hodson

Brevet Major William Stephen Raikes Hodson (1821–1858) was a British leader of irregular light cavalry who raised the Cavalry regiment known as Hodson's Horse during the rebellion of 1857. It exists today as the 4th Horse Regiment, an armoured regiment in the Indian Army.

Hodson had the distinction of equipping his regiment in khaki-coloured uniform, which is considered the precursor of modern camouflage uniform. The tradition of the khaki uniform continues as the summer uniform in La Martiniere College, Lucknow. Hodson's grave and memorial lie within the grounds of the college.

Coat of arms
The La Martinière coat of arms was designed by the founder Claude Martin. The coat of arms and the motto Labore et Constantia are now shared by all the schools founded by Martin. The La Martinere College flag consists of the coat of arms on a blue and gold background. The flag is flown above the buildings, and used for formal events and celebrations, such as the annual Founder's Day.

College song
Vive La Martiniere is the school song for the three schools founded by Major General Claude Martin in Calcutta and Lucknow in India and in Lyon, France. The song was written in the late 1860s by Frederick James Rowe while he was an English teacher at the brother school, La Martiniere Boys' College in Calcutta, India. The song is now an inseparable part of the ceremonies at all seven schools, and is sung in honour of the school's founder Claude Martin. Two recordings of the song are available online. The first version is complete with words, while the second version is a recording of the music only.

Hail! Hail! the name we own,
Hail! to the giver :
Blessing and bright renown,
Be his for ever!

All his martial deeds may die,
Lasting still his charity;
This his laurel blooms for aye,
Dead, he lives in us today.

This, then, our song shall be,
As we chant his eulogy –
"May our Founder's name endure,
Ever spotless, ever pure!"

[Chorus]
Faithful may we ever be,
Followers of his constancy;
Firm of hand against the foe,
Soft of heart to succour woe.

This, then, our song shall be,
As we chant his eulogy –
"May our Founder's name endure,
Ever spotless, ever pure!"
– Frederick James Rowe, "Vive La Martiniere"

Notable Martinians

Old Martinians' Association
Hubert S Bolst (1872–1947) was the founder of the Alumni Association. He was an old boy of the school who got together with several Martinians stationed at Faizabad to celebrate Founder's Day. This unofficial gathering was the genesis of the present-day Old Martinians' Association (OMA) which now has chapters spread across the globe. The OMA chapters in Australia, the UK, and Canada are the more active ones.

The Bolst Fund
Bolst died in 1947 and in his will left instructions that a sum of Rs. 5,000 be handed over to the OMA as an 'Endowment Fund'. The interest accruing from this investment was to be used to provide a scholarship to pay the fees for a needy and deserving Anglo-Indian day scholar boy. Since then, some 50 recipients of the scholarship have reason to be thankful to Hubert Bolst.

Presently the Alumni Association is known as "La Martiniere Alumni" (LMA); its office is situated in the College Campus. Presently the President is Mr Jaideep Narain Mathur (Designated Advocate, at the Allahabad High Court, Lucknow Bench) he is a pass-out of the I.S.C. batch of 1981. The Patron is the College Principal, Mr Carlyle McFarland himself an alumnus of the I.S.C Batch of 1979.

Further reading
 Chandan Mitra. Constant glory: La Martinière saga 1836–1986. Calcutta: Oxford University Press, 1987, 95pp. .
 Edward H Hilton. The Martiniere boys in the Bailey Guard. Lucknow : American Methodist Mission Press, 1877, 18pp.
Rules and Regulations of La Martiniere, founded in Calcutta under the will of Major General Claude Martin with an extract of the will of the testator, the decree of the supreme court with regard to the same and other documents. Published by order of the Governors. Calcutta: La Martiniere College, 1835, 103pp.
 Rosie Llewellyn-Jones. A very ingenious man: Claude Martin in early colonial India. Delhi: Oxford University Press, 1993, 241pp. .
 Bright Renown

See also

La Martiniere Calcutta
La Martiniere College
La Martiniere Lyon
Claude Martin
:Category:La Martinière College, Lucknow alumni
Martin Purwa
The will of Claude Martin
Vive La Martiniere, the school song by Frederick James Rowe
Claude Martin Wade, a Colonel named after Claude Martin
Zamindar

References

External links

 

Education in Lucknow
Schools in Lucknow
Educational institutions established in 1845
La Martinière College
Private schools in Lucknow
1845 establishments in British India
Tourist attractions in Lucknow